Edgar Emanuel Garcês França (born 8 February 1996) is a Portuguese footballer who is last known to have played as an attacker for Cape Umoya United.

Career

At the age of 11, França almost joined the youth academy of Portuguese top flight side Sporting from the youth academy of Estrela da Calheta in the Portuguese sixth division, where he was compared to Portugal international Cristiano Ronaldo. In 2017, he signed for Portuguese club Marítimo C. In 2019, França signed for Cape Umoya United in South Africa, where he made 5 appearances and scored 0 goals. On 2 November 2019, he debuted for Cape Umoya United during a 3-3 draw with Cape Town Spurs.

References

External links
 
 Edgar França at playmakerstats.com

Portuguese footballers
Living people
1996 births
Association football forwards
Expatriate soccer players in South Africa
People from Madeira
A.D. Camacha players
Cape Umoya United F.C. players
Madeiran footballers